Vattan Sandhu is a Punjabi singer and actor. He is known for his Punjabi songs. He was born in Sarwali Village, Gurdaspur. He rose to fame from his single "Lecture" which broke many records in Punjab. Dad vs. Son was his most successful track reaching over 2 million views as of September 2015.

Music career
Sandhu made his debut with the song Lecture which went on to become an instant success and brought him into the limelight in the Punjabi music industry. He saw further success with songs like "Dad vs. Son," and "Valentine Day". In 2015 his new single "Begani" was also setting a new stage for the Punjabi music industry.

Personal life
Vattan Sandhu is 24, started singing when he was 10 years old. His father Tejwinder Singh Sandhu is in the Punjab police. He has one younger brother who is a professional photographer. He moved to London when he was 18; there he was selected for the British Army (soldier), but he decided to return to India to pursue singing.

Discography

References

Indian male voice actors
Punjabi-language singers
Punjabi music
Living people
Punjabi people
Bhangra (music) musicians
Indian male singers
1992 births